The demolition of monuments to Alexander Pushkin in Ukraine started during the Russo-Ukrainian War. During the 2022 Russian invasion of Ukraine it has become a widespread phenomenon and dubbed by Ukrainians Pushkinopad (Пушкінопад), a pun literally translated as "Pushkinfall". This wave of dismantling is part of the process of derussification in Ukraine.

History 

According to Volodymyr Yermolenko, Russian literature has been a vehicle of the country’s imperial project and nationalist world-view. Pushkin's poem Poltava recounts the revolt of Ukrainian Cossack hetman Ivan Mazepa against Tsar Peter the Great from the Russian point of view and portrays Mazepa as a lecherous traitor. Following the Russian invasion of Ukraine in February 2022, Pushkin's situation turned out to be quite similar to the destruction of monuments to Lenin known as Leninopad. The phenomenon was dubbed "Pushkinopad" (Пушкінопад) by Ukrainians, a pun literally translated as "Pushkinfall", with the coinage of "-пад" being akin to English words suffixed with "fall" as in "waterfall", "snowfall", etc. 

The first event that became widely known was the dismantling of the monument to Pushkin in Mukachevo on April 7, 2022. Monuments to the Russian poet were dismantled in Uzhhorod and Ternopil on April 9. Serhiy Nadal, mayor of Ternopil, commented:

On March 22, 2022, a resident of Ternopil painted a Pushkin monument red and wrote "stop war" on it. With his action he drew attention to the need to dismantle the monument. In Ternopil, the monument to the poet was erected in 1961. The first initiatives to demolish it appeared in 2014, after the start of the Russo-Ukrainian War. 

On April 7, 2022, a monument to Pushkin was demolished in Mukachevo. The very next day, the Uzhhorod City Council also decided to dismantle the monument to Alexander Pushkin

On April 11, 2022, a bust of Pushkin was dismantled in the village of Zabolotivtsi, Lviv Oblast.

On April 19, 2022, in Kropyvnytskyi, they proposed to remove the monument to Pushkin, which currently stands near the Pedagogical University. The monument was dismantled on July 8, 2022.

On April 26, 2022, a monument to Alexander Pushkin was torn down in the village of Pushkino in the Berehove Raion of the Zakarpattia Oblast, and meetings began to rename the village.

On April 28, 2022, a monument to Pushkin was dismantled in Konotop. The head was torn off during the dismantling of the monument.

On April 30, 2022, a Pushkin monument was destroyed in Chernihiv.

On May 5, 2022, a memorial plaque to Pushkin was dismantled in Vinnytsia.

On May 8, 2022, the bust was dismantled in Deliatyn, Ivano-Frankivsk Oblast.

On May 13, 2022, a bust of Pushkin was dismantled from the entrance gate of the Oleksandriia Dendrological Park in Bila Tserkva.

On May 21, 2022, a monument to Pushkin was dismantled in Mykolaiv.

On June 1, 2022, a monument to Alexander Pushkin was damaged in Nikopol.

On June 3, 2022, the "Ukrainian People's House" society proposed to remove the bust of Pushkin from the building of the Olha Kobylyanska Drama Theater in Chernivtsi and replace it with the bust of Yurii Fedkovych. The director of the theater supported the proposal but stressed that all legal requirements and regulations had to be met before removing the bust.

On June 16, 2022, a working group of the Ministry of Education and Science of Ukraine decided to remove more than 40 works by Soviet and Russian authors, including Alexander Pushkin, from school textbooks.

On July 26, 2022, a bust of Pushkin was dismantled in Zaporizhzhia. The bust made of forged copper stood in the city for more than 20 years and was dismantled with the permission of the mayor's office.

On September 1, 2022, a bust of Pushkin was dismantled in Kyiv on the territory of gymnasium No. 153 (named after Pushkin).

On October 11, 2022, unknown persons dismantled the second bust of Pushkin in front of the National Transport University in Kyiv. The co-founder of the "Decommunization Ukraine" project said that the dismantling was dedicated to Lieutenant of the Armed Forces of Ukraine Denys Antipov, alias "Buk" - a well-known public activist, teacher of the Korean language at the Taras Shevchenko National University of Kyiv, who had died in May 2022 in a battle with Russian invaders.

On November 9, 2022, a bust of Pushkin, which stood on Poetry Maidan in Kharkiv, was dismantled and sent for safekeeping. The Kharkiv City Council stated that this monument, and possibly others, should be preserved, but the residents will decide this issue in peacetime.

On November 11, 2022, a monument to Pushkin was dismantled in Zhytomyr.

On November 11, 2022, a monument to Pushkin in the city of Zhmerynka was dismantled.

On November 16, 2022, Pushkin Avenue in Dnipro was renamed Lesia Ukrainka Avenue. A monument to Pushkin that stood there was dismantled on December 16, 2022.

On November 17, 2022, a statue of Pushkin was dismantled in Chernivtsi.

On November 20, 2022, unknown persons overthrew a bust of Pushkin in Nikopol.

On November 21, 2022, a monument to Pushkin in Kremenchuk was dismantled.

On November 29, 2022, a memorial plaque to Pushkin was dismantled in Mykolaiv.

On November 29, 2022, a monument to Pushkin was dismantled in Ananiv.

On December 9, 2022, the monument to Pushkin in the city of Tulchyn was dismantled.

The monument to Pushkin in the Dnipro was dismantled on December 16, 2022.

On December 23, 2022, the second sculpture of Pushkin was dismantled in the city of Chernivtsi.

On December 24, 2022, it was dismantled in the city of Krolevets.

On December 27, 2022, the bust of Pushkin was dismantled from the facade of the Chernivtsi Drama Theater named after Olha Kobylianska.

On December 29, 2022, the bust was dismantled in Polonne.

On December 29, 2022, the second memorial plaque to Pushkin was dismantled in the city of Mykolaiv.

On December 30, 2022, a monument to Pushkin was dismantled in Kramatorsk.

See also 

 Demolition of monuments to Vladimir Lenin in Ukraine

References

External links 

 Special operation "Derusification". Interview with Vakhtang Kipiani, Editor-in-Chief of Historical Truth

Derussification
Anti-Russian sentiment
Events affected by the 2022 Russian invasion of Ukraine
2022 in Ukraine
Statues in Ukraine
Pushkin, Alexander in Ukraine
Alexander Pushkin